Wilhelm Götz (date of birth unknown) was a Swiss footballer who played for FC Basel in the 1890s.

Football career
FC Basel was founded on 15 November 1893 and Götz joined the club a few months later during their 1893–94 season.

He played his first game for the club in the home game in the Stadion Schützenmatte on 5 May 1895 as Basel won 2–0 against Abstinenten FC Patria Basel.

He stayed with the club for two seasons and during this time Götz played a total of five games for Basel without scoring a goal.

Notes

Footnotes

References

Sources
 Rotblau: Jahrbuch Saison 2017/2018. Publisher: FC Basel Marketing AG. 
 Die ersten 125 Jahre. Publisher: Josef Zindel im Friedrich Reinhardt Verlag, Basel. 
 Verein "Basler Fussballarchiv" Homepage
(NB: Despite all efforts, the editors of these books and the authors in "Basler Fussballarchiv" have failed to be able to identify all the players, their date and place of birth or date and place of death, who played in the games during the early years of FC Basel)

FC Basel players
Swiss men's footballers
Date of birth missing
Date of death missing
Association footballers not categorized by position